Bantunding is a village in the Gambia. It is located in Wuli East District in the Upper River Division. As of 2009, it has an estimated population of 1114. Bantunding is home to several traditional rulers locally known as (Seyfo). The last chief from the village is called Sergeant Madi Wally. Madi Wally’ Father Jumu Wally also served as chief.

Bantunding was the capital of the pre-colonial Kingdom of Wuli.

References

Populated places in the Gambia
Upper River Division